The Economics of Happiness is a 2011 documentary film directed by Helena Norberg-Hodge, Steven Gorelick, and John Page, and produced by Local Futures (formerly the International Society for Ecology and Culture).

Synopsis
The film features many voices from six continents calling for systemic economic change. The documentary describes a world moving simultaneously in two opposing directions. While government and big business continue to promote globalization and the consolidation of corporate power, people around the world are resisting those policies and working to forge a very different future. Communities are coming together to re-build more human scale, ecological economies based on a new paradigm: an economics of localization.

Recognition
The Economics of Happiness has won "Best in Show" at the Cinema Verde Film and Arts Festival, "Best Direction" from EKOFilm 2011 (Czech Republic), "Judges' Choice" and "Audience Choice" at the Auroville International Film Festival (India), an "Award of Merit" from the Accolade Film Festival, and several other awards.

In 2012, the film was listed among the top ten films as chosen by Transition town initiatives.

In 2015, it was awarded 1st place out of 100 "documentaries we can use to change the world" by Films for Action, an activism-oriented film screening and compilation site.

References

External links
 
 
 Helena Norberg-Hodge at Counter Currents
 Norberg-Hodge on the film

2011 films
2011 documentary films
Documentary films about economics
Documentary films about globalization
Australian documentary films
2010s English-language films